Gallatin Valley Mall is a shopping mall located in Bozeman, Montana, United States that opened in 1980. Its anchors are Macy's (formerly The Bon Marché), Jo-Ann Fabrics, and Barnes & Noble. It also has a Rocky Mountain Bank and a Regal Cinemas. In 2013, a Petco was built. On June 4, 2020, it was announced that JCPenney would be closing as part of a plan to close 154 stores nationwide. The store closed in October 2020.

References

External links
 

Buildings and structures in Bozeman, Montana
Shopping malls established in 1980
Shopping malls in Montana
Tourist attractions in Bozeman, Montana
1980 establishments in Montana